This is a list of municipalities in Artvin Province, Turkey .

References 

Geography of Artvin Province
Artvin